MV Coastal Renaissance is the first of three  ships delivered to BC Ferries. At the time of their construction, the Coastal-class ferries were the largest double-ended ferries in the world. This ship operates mainly on the Departure BayHorseshoe Bay route in the peak season and on the Swartz BayTsawwassen route in the low season, but can replace her sister ships on any of the major cross-Strait routes whenever they go for refits.

Description

The vessel has capacity for 370 vehicles and a crew and passenger capacity of 1,604. Amenities aboard the ship include a Coastal Cafe, Coast Cafe Express, Sitka Coffee Place, Seawest Lounge, Passages Gift Shop, Kids Zone, Video Zone and a Pet Area.

Service history
BC Ferries ordered three ferries from Flensburger Schiffbau-Gesellschaft (FSG), Germany. Coastal Renaissance was the first laid down, on January 2, 2007, with the yard number 733. The ferry was launched on April 19, 2007, and was completed on October 27, 2007. The name Coastal Renaissance was chosen by BC Ferries to represent the company's renewal. At the time of her construction, Coastal Renaissance was the largest double-ended ferry in the world. The ship left FSG for her delivery voyage to British Columbia on October 27, 2007.  She transited the Panama Canal on November 21.

The ship arrived at Nanaimo on December 13, 2007, and entered service on March 9, 2008. The vessel sails the Departure BayHorseshoe Bay and TsawassenSwartz Bay routes. Coastal Renaissance carried the Olympic flame for Vancouver 2010.

In 2011, Coastal Renaissance replaced sister ship  on the TsawwassenDeparture Bay route, after Coastal Inspiration rammed the ferry terminal at Duke Point. On October 25, 2017, Coastal Renaissance took part in a training exercise with members of the U.S. Coast Guard, Canadian Coast Guard and Canadian Forces, along with local agencies in Trincomali Channel.

Notes

Citations

References

External links
 
 BC Ferries Newbuild Program

Coastal-class ferries
Ships built in Flensburg
2007 ships